The Pegtymel is a river in Far East Siberia, Russia. It passes through the sparsely populated areas of the Siberian tundra and flows into the East Siberian Sea west of the Long Strait. Its mouth is between Cape Shelagsky on Chaunskaya Bay and Cape Billings to the east. Its most important tributary is the Kuvet which joins it from the right side.

The Pegtymel and its tributaries belong to the Chukotka Autonomous Okrug administrative region of Russia.

There are ancient rock paintings on a site close to the Pegtymel. The petroglyphs show boats, reindeer hunting, and mushroom-headed figures likely representing a ritual with th hallucinognic mushroom fly agaric (Amanita muscaria).

References

External links
Tourism and environment
Petroglyph pictures

Rivers of Chukotka Autonomous Okrug
Drainage basins of the East Siberian Sea
Chukotka Mountains